The Porterville General Store is a historic structure in Porterville, Kemper County, Mississippi. The wood-frame building on a brick foundation was constructed in 1913. Dr. W. F. Rogers built it to replace a previous store that burned. It was added to the National Register of Historic Places on March 17, 2006. The building is located on Old Mississippi Highway 45. It is now an art studio. It was near the Mobile and Ohio Railroad (M&O) line's station.

See also
National Register of Historic Places listings in Mississippi

References

External links
Artist's website

Commercial buildings on the National Register of Historic Places in Mississippi
National Register of Historic Places in Kemper County, Mississippi
Retail buildings in Mississippi
Commercial buildings completed in 1913
General stores in the United States